335 Medical Evacuation Regiment is a British Army medical regiment and part of 2 Medical Brigade.  It is an Army Reserve unit, part of the Royal Army Medical Corps, and has a unique role within the Armed Forces.  The Regiment is paired with all three of the armoured medical regiments within the Reactive Force: 1 Armoured Medical Regiment, 4 Armoured Medical Regiment and 5 Armoured Medical Regiment. Although it is administered from Queen Elizabeth Barracks in North Yorkshire, as a specialist unit the regiment recruits reservists from all over the UK.

History

335 Medical Evacuation Regiment was formed on 1 April 2005 from the Ambulance Train Group (Volunteers).  The Regiment has a long history which can be traced back to the ambulance trains of the Boer War of 1899 to 1902.  It has deployed personnel on every major offensive, peacekeeping and humanitarian operation since 2005.

Role

335 Medical Evacuation Regiment is the Army Reserve's specialist medevac unit.  The Regiment trains pre-hospital emergency care clinicians to deploy on operations and exercises around the world either as an individual augmentee or as part of a formed unit.  The Regiment provides two main capabilities:

Forward Medevac: Moving forward to the point of injury to collect casualties and provide pre-hospital emergency care whilst moving rearwards to a medical treatment facility.  This includes the provision of Ground Medical Emergency Response Teams (MERT).
Tactical Medevac: Moving stabilised casualties between medical treatment facilities, for example a Role 2 to a Role 3, including the provision of high dependency in-transit care.

The Regiment operates in a range of Army ambulances including the Land Rover Battlefield Ambulance, protected mobility ambulances such as the Mastiff Ambulance, and tracked armoured ambulances such as the Samaritan Ambulance and the Bulldog Ambulance.  The Regiment is involved with the design of the Future Protected Battlefield Ambulance (MRV-P FPBFA) that is due to enter service in 2019.

Organisation

335 Medical Evacuation Regiment has a Regimental Headquarters and three operational Squadrons: A, B and C.  Each Squadron comprises several Troops which specialise in either forward or tactical medevac.

The regiment is paired with all three of the armoured medical regiments within the Regular Army: 1 Armoured Medical Regiment, 4 Armoured Medical Regiment and 5 Armoured Medical Regiment.

Personnel

335 Medical Evacuation Regiment has reservists from various trades and professions.  As a specialist unit the regiment recruits reservists from all over the UK, and training is undertaken throughout the UK and overseas.

Soldiers
Combat Medical Technician
Paramedic 
Nurse 
Driver
Human Resource Specialist

Officers
Medical Officer
Nursing Officer
Medical Support Officer

Notable personnel

Corporal Ben Spittle RAMC.  Paramedic awarded the Queen's Commendation for Valuable Service as a result of his actions in Afghanistan in 2013.
Corporal Philip Keogh RAMC.  Paramedic awarded Best Reservist in the 2017 The Sun Military Awards, known as the Millies, for his actions when responding to the terror attack at the Manchester Arena on 22 May 2017.

References

External links 
 

Units of the Royal Army Medical Corps
Military units and formations established in 2005